Guro may refer to:
Ero guro, a Japanese art movement focusing on eroticism and the grotesque
Guro, the Filipino word for "teacher", a teacher of Filipino martial arts; derived from the Sanskrit word guru
Guro-dong, a dong (neighborhood) in Guru-gu, Seoul
Guro-gu, a gu (district) in Seoul, South Korea
Guro station, a railway and subway station in Seoul, South Korea
 Guro language, Mande language of Côte d'Ivoire

People  
Elena Guro (1877–1913), Russian artist and writer
Guro Angell Gimse (born 1971), Norwegian politician
Guro Fjellanger (1964–2019), Norwegian politician
Guro Kleven Hagen (born 1994), Norwegian violinist
Guro Knutsen, Norwegian football player
Guro Reiten (born 1994), Norwegian association football player
Guro Skumsnes Moe (born 1983), Norwegian musician
Guro Strøm Solli (born 1983), Norwegian cross country skier
Guro Valen (1960–2014), Norwegian professor of medicine
Guros (1905–1981), Armenian artist
Đuro or Ǵuro, a given name